Bacchus Marsh (Wathawurrung: Pullerbopulloke) is an urban centre and suburban locality in Victoria, Australia located approximately  north west of the state capital Melbourne and  west of Melton at a near equidistance to the major cities of Melbourne, Ballarat and Geelong. The population of the Bacchus Marsh urban area was 22,223 at June 2018. Bacchus Marsh is the largest urban area in the local government area of Shire of Moorabool.

Traditionally a market garden area producing a large amount of the region's fruits and vegetables, in recent decades it has transformed into the main commuter town on the Melbourne-Ballarat corridor.

It was named after the colonial settler Captain William Henry Bacchus, who saw the great value of this locality as it was situated on two rivers — the Lerderderg and Werribee.

History

Aboriginal

Bacchus Marsh is on the border between the Woiwurrung and Wathaurong territories of the Kulin Nation. The local clans were the Marpeang balug of the Wathaurong, and the Gunung-willam-bulluk (Wurundjeri) of the Woiwurrung. Bacchus Marsh was a meeting ground for anywhere between 150 and 400 Aboriginals even after white settlement, and corroborees were held quite regularly. While there do not appear to be any records of open hostilities between whites and indigenous people, by 1863 there were a total of only 33 Aboriginal people left in the Bacchus Marsh district, and apart from a handful of recollections of the original inhabitants preserved by pioneer settlers, sadly little remains apart from present-day locality names, mainly of watercourses: Coimadai, Djerriwarrh, Korkuperrimul, Lerderderg, Merrimu, Myrniong, Werribee. The Wathawurrung name for the area is Pullerbopulloke  with 'buluk' meaning lake.

European settlement
One of the first white men to reach the Bacchus Marsh valley was pastoralist Kenneth Scobie Clarke (c. 1806–79), a native of Sutherland in Scotland. Clarke was a manager for the Great Lake Company of Van Diemen’s Land and arrived in the Port Phillip District from George Town on 25 March 1836. Captain Bacchus credited Clarke as being the first man to shear sheep in Victoria, although the Hentys had arrived in Portland with their sheep some two years earlier.

On 29 November 1836, Clarke headed west from Port Phillip with a large flock of sheep, arriving in the Bacchus Marsh district a few days later. He built a hut on the west bank of the Lerderderg River near Darley, and lived there until early 1838. According to pastoralist George Russell, Clarke had acted on information obtained from Mr Aitken, an Edinburgh man, who was most put out when he discovered that Clarke had beaten him to the Pentland Hills run.

In 1838, Englishman Captain William Henry Bacchus (1782–1849, originally of the 2nd Royal Surrey Militia) and his son William Henry Bacchus junior (1820–87) also brought sheep from Tasmania and came to the district which now bears their name. On their arrival, Clarke made an arrangement with them and ceded his run, moving to the nearby hills known as the Pentlands. The then very swampy valley was not really suitable for sheep, as they were prone to footrot. Clarke stayed in the district until 1840 or 1841, and later went to New Zealand, where he died in 1879.

As all land within  of a squatter’s hut was considered to belong to him, Bacchus and his son immediately set about consolidating their land holdings. Between 1845–47 Captain Bacchus built the Manor House, a two-storey Georgian brick building that still stands in the township today. Captain Bacchus died in 1849 and was buried in what later became the grounds of Holy Trinity Anglican Church, Gisborne Road. By 1851, Henry Bacchus junior had sold his holdings in Bacchus Marsh and moved to Peerewur (or  Perewerrh) run near Ballarat.

Situated roughly halfway between Melbourne and Ballarat, Bacchus Marsh was a popular stopover for travellers during the Victorian Gold Rush. Diarist Charles Evans described the location in 1853:

19th century to present
The township was originally known as Ballan, a Post Office opening under that name around July 1844 (Bacchus Marsh from 1 July 1850).
The Bacchus Marsh Road District Board was proclaimed on 30 September 1856, with one of its first tasks being to construct a gravel road through the town, as at that time the road was barely passable in winter. Bacchus Marsh was created a district on 14 October 1862, and the Road Board was the governing body until the Shire of Bacchus Marsh was proclaimed on 23 January 1871. The railway came to Bacchus Marsh on 15 February 1887, and the through line to Ballarat was built in 1890.'

During the 1970s and 1980s it was home to the Bacchus Marsh Lion and Tiger Safari.

In 1994 the Shire of Bacchus Marsh was amalgamated with the Shire of Ballan and parts of the Shires of Bungaree and Werribee to form the Shire of Moorabool.

Bacchus Marsh and its suburbs form the largest settlement in Moorabool Shire.

Bacchus Marsh grew rapidly from the 1990s.

Heritage listed sites

Bacchus Marsh contains a number of heritage listed sites, including:

 Bacchus Marsh Road, Bacchus Marsh Avenue of Honour
 123 Main Street, Bacchus Marsh Court House
 8 Gisborne Road and 8 Church Street, Bacchus Marsh Express Office and Printing Works
 119 Main Street, Bacchus Marsh Police Station and Old Lock-Up
 100–102 Main Street, Blacksmith's Cottage and Shop
 12 Ellerslie Court, Ellerslie
 28–32 Manor Street, Manor House
 37 Grant Street, Millbank
 6 Gisborne Road, Residence
 10 Gisborne Road, Residence
In addition, a Pioneer Women's Memorial Avenue commemorates the lives of the women of the Bacchus Marsh area.

Urban structure

At June 2018, Bacchus Marsh had a population of 22,223.

According to the 2016 census of Population, the Bacchus Marsh Significant Urban Area recorded the following highlights:
 Aboriginal and Torres Strait Islander people made up 1.3% of the population. 
 81.1% of people were born in Australia. The next most common countries of birth were England 3.5%, New Zealand 1.4%, India 0.8%, Scotland 0.6% and Germany 0.5%.   
 88.2% of people spoke only English at home. Other languages spoken at home included Italian 0.5% and Punjabi 0.5%. 
 The most common responses for religion were No Religion 35.7%, Catholic 28.0% and Anglican 11.9%.

It covers a large area in the Werribee Valley with its Central Business District centred along Main Street between Bennett Street to the north, Grant Street/Gisborne Road to the west, Young/Lord Streets to the east and Waddell/Simpson Streets to the south. Bacchus Marsh Village shopping centre is its main indoor shopping mall. The state suburb by the same name is home to 6,394 people and contains the central business district. The population of the urban area of Bacchus Marsh has grown by 34.6% over the decade leading to 2016.

Beyond central Bacchus Marsh, suburban areas such as the former towns of Darley (1861) to the north and Maddingley to the south continue to grow rapidly. Housing development has also occurred in the natural extension of Bacchus Marsh like Underbank, and its surrounding areas including Parwan, Hopetoun Park and Merrimu.

Transport

Automobiles are the main form of transport. The Western Freeway which is the main route to both Melbourne (approximately 48 minutes) in the east and Ballarat (46 minutes) to the west. The freeway divides Bacchus Marsh and its northern suburb Darley. Three interchanges serve the urban area – the Gisborne Road (full- diamond) along with Hallets Way and Bacchus Marsh Road (both with a half-diamond). With the exception of the central business district and neighbouring areas, the majority of the urban area is laid out in a street hierarchy pattern with collector roads leading to the two major cross roads – Bacchus Marsh Road (C802) and Bacchus Marsh-Gisborne Road/Bacchus Marsh-Geelong Road (C704) which bear the majority of vehicular traffic.

Until 2012, the entrance to the town from Melbourne was via Anthonys Cutting, a relatively steep downhill run, which is speed limited to 80 km/h.  The freeway was realigned under the Victorian Transport Plan bypassing Anthony's cutting, resulting in decreased travel time to Melbourne.

The Bacchus Marsh station is on the Ballarat line. V/Line provides VLocity services to Melbourne (from 38 minutes) and Ballarat (from 34 minutes).

A bus service connects the station with the town centre and other residential areas.

Bacchus Marsh Airfield (located in Parwan to the south) provides for general aviation and the area is home to a flying school and three gliding clubs.

Recreation and open space

One of Bacchus Marsh’s principal recreation areas is Maddingley Park, which is a favourite picnic destination for both locals and visitors. Near the south gates of the park, opposite the Bacchus Marsh railway station, is the Nieuwesteeg Heritage Rose Garden of mainly twentieth century hybrid teas.

Walks along the Lerderderg River provide access to the steep, rugged and overgrown Lerderderg Gorge and the extensive Wombat State Park that surrounds it, criss-crossed by four-wheel drive tracks, extensive bushwalking amongst historic mining relics and natural bush.

Bacchus Marsh Airfield is home to the largest site in Australia for recreational gliding.

Health services

The township of Bacchus Marsh is serviced by the Djerriwarrh Health Services (Bacchus Marsh Hospital) formerly, Bacchus Marsh War Memorial Hospital, and several general practice medical centres, including Bacchus Marsh Medical Centre located opposite the hospital in Turner Street and The Elms Family Medical Centre located at the Bacchus Marsh Village Shopping Centre on Main Street near the Avenue of Honour.
The Elms Family Medical Centre was established in 1994 and is actively involved in the teaching and mentoring of future general practitioners. Doctors from both practices provide comprehensive medical care to patients at the Bacchus Marsh Hospital, as well as at the local Providence Aged Care Hostel and Grant Lodge Nursing Home. Both clinics have affiliations with the Deakin University School of Medicine through the hosting of third year medical students as part of the Integrated Model of Medical Education in Rural Settings (IMMERSE) program, with The Elms first having a medical student in 2011 and the Bacchus Marsh Medical Centre in 2014.

Education
Schools in Bacchus Marsh include:
 Bacchus Marsh Primary School
 Darley Primary School
 Pentland Primary School
 St Bernard's Primary School (Catholic)
 Balliang East Primary
 Bacchus Marsh College
 Bacchus Marsh Grammar

Adult & Vocational Education
 Bacchus Marsh Community College aka The Laurels
 Western Institute of Technology

Community Learning
 Darley Neighbourhood House & Learning Centre

Sports and community groups

 Australian rules football, Cricket, Soccer and Netball are all very popular.
 Notable sporting teams include Darley Football Club and Bacchus Marsh Football Club who both compete in the Ballarat Football League.
 Bacchus Marsh Tigers Baseball Club compete in the Geelong Baseball Association winter competition.
Bacchus Marsh Scorpions Soccer Club play at Masons Lane Reserve and compete in FFV metro and Ballarat and District Soccer Association. Soccer In Bacchus Marsh has grown to be one of the largest participation sports.
 Another sport that has come popular over the years in Bacchus Marsh is the Korfball Association.
 Golfers play at the Bacchus Marsh Golf Club on Links Road or at the Bacchus Marsh West Golf Club on Bacchus Marsh – Balliang Road.
 The Bacchus Marsh Tennis Club maintains 9 artificial grass courts and 13 grass courts.  It is a social venue for all groups and abilities, with well maintained multi-surface courts including grass, artificial grass and red porous. A full-time club coach is available for private and group lessons.
 The airfield is also the home of three gliding clubs: Geelong Gliding Club, Melbourne Gliding Club (VMFG) and Beaufort Gliding Club. Pilots from these clubs have represented Australia in international gliding competitions.

Notable people
 William Symington C.E. (ca.1802 – 17 March 1867) inventor and son of steamboat pioneer William Symington.
 Victorian Cross recipient Rupert Vance Moon
 Physicist and professor Sir Kerr Grant (1878–1967)
 Victorian Premier from 1927–1928 and 1929–1932, Edmond Hogan (1883–1964)
 Pianist and composer Isabel Varney Desmond Peterson (1892–1967)
 Carlton Australian rules footballer Harry "Soapy" Vallence (1905–1991)
 Author Frank Hardy (1917–1994) and his sister, actor and comedian Mary Hardy (1931–1985)
 Dual Booker Prize winning author Peter Carey
 Home to Dancing with the Stars judge Helen Richey
 AFL star Doug Hawkins (b. 1960)
 AFL Footballer from Fremantle Football Club Nick Suban (b. 1990)
 Actor Travis Burns (b. 1991)
 Australian scientific illustrator, plant pathologist, mycologist (fungi specialist), university lecturer and dairy farmer Charles Clifton Brittlebank (1 Jan 1863 – 3 Nov 1945)                             
    *AFL player Zak Butters (b. 2000)
AFL player Liam Duggan (b. 1996)
Botanist Lesley R. Kerr (1900–1927) who formulated the term and analysis of Lignotubers in Eucalyptus

References

External links

Bacchus Marsh & District Historical Society Inc.
Bacchus Marsh Tourism Association Inc.
 Bacchus Marsh History Website
 

 
Towns in Victoria (Australia)